Plymouth is an electoral ward in the town of Penarth, Vale of Glamorgan, Wales. It covers the more affluent part of the town south of the town centre. It stretches either side of Lavernock Road which includes Lower Penarth and Cosmeston (including Glamorganshire Golf Club and Cosmeston Lakes). The ward elects two county councillors to Vale of Glamorgan Council and four councillors to Penarth Town Council. A majority of its councillors represent the Conservative Party.

The name of the ward refers to Plymouth Road, and to the Earls of Plymouth, who were major landowners in the area.

According to the 2011 census, the population of the ward was 5,836.

Background
Following The County Borough of The Vale of Glamorgan (Electoral Changes) Order 2002 the county ward of Alexandra was divided to become St Augustine's and Plymouth wards, effective from October 2003 for preliminary electoral proceedings, but fully effective at the May 2004 Vale of Glamorgan Council elections. However, Plymouth had been a community ward for elections to Penarth Town Council prior to that.

County council elections

* = sitting councillor prior to the election

Town Council elections
At the Penarth Town Council election on 4 May 2017, two long-standing councillors, Anthony Ernest and Clive Williams, lost their seats after choosing to stand as Independents. Williams had been de-selected by the Conservatives in favour of Martin Turner and Kathryn McCaffer. Two other sitting councillors, Ian Courtney (Labour) and Wendy van den Brom (Conservative), were also replaced by the voters.

* = sitting councillor prior to the election

References

Vale of Glamorgan electoral wards
Penarth